Alan Forbes is a poster artist and painter who lives in San Francisco, California. He does posters and album work for The Chris Robinson Brotherhood. He has also created the iconic logo for The Black Crowes. He has done posters for Howlin Rain, Queens of the Stone Age, Rocky Erickson, Boneback and many others. He has also done album art for AFI and Goldfinger. Born in Connecticut in 1968, he is currently a California resident.

References

External links
 

1969 births
Living people
Artists from Connecticut
20th-century American artists
American poster artists
21st-century American artists
The Black Crowes